Jessé Farias de Lima (born 16 February 1981) is a Brazilian high jumper. His personal best jump is 2.32 metres, achieved in September 2008 in Lausanne. This is the current Brazilian record.

Major competitions record

References

1981 births
Living people
Brazilian male high jumpers
Athletes (track and field) at the 2003 Pan American Games
Athletes (track and field) at the 2007 Pan American Games
Athletes (track and field) at the 2004 Summer Olympics
Athletes (track and field) at the 2008 Summer Olympics
Olympic athletes of Brazil
Pan American Games athletes for Brazil
20th-century Brazilian people
21st-century Brazilian people